San Benito, officially the Municipality of San Benito, is a 6th class municipality in the province of Surigao del Norte, Philippines. According to the 2020 census, it has a population of 5,663 people.

Geography

Barangays
San Benito is politically subdivided into 6 barangays.
 Bongdo
 Maribojoc 
 Nuevo Campo 
 San Juan 
 Santa Cruz (Poblacion) 
 Talisay (Poblacion)

Climate

Demographics

Economy

References

External links
San Benito Profile at PhilAtlas.com
San Benito Profile at the DTI Cities and Municipalities Competitive Index
[ Philippine Standard Geographic Code]
Philippine Census Information
Local Governance Performance Management System

Municipalities of Surigao del Norte